Endotricha metacuralis is a species of snout moth in the genus Endotricha. It is found in Taiwan and China (Guizhou).

References

Moths described in 1916
Endotrichini